Delhi Urdu Akhbar published from Delhi, India in 1837 AD was the first Urdu language daily newspaper. Moulvi Muhammad Baqir was its first editor.

Further reading
Rekhta Books

References 

News magazines published in India
Weekly magazines published in India
Defunct magazines published in India
Magazines with year of disestablishment missing
Urdu-language newspapers published in India